Michael Enright may refer to:
 Michael Enright (actor) (born ), British actor
 Michael Enright (broadcaster) (born 1943), Canadian radio broadcaster
 Michael Enright (politician) (1952–1997), Irish Democratic Left politician, briefly a senator